The Deacon Jones Trophy is an annual player of the year award given to the most outstanding all-around collegiate American football player of the year among teams from Historically Black Colleges and Universities. The trophy was named in honor of the late National Football League (NFL) player  Deacon Jones, who played for South Carolina State and Mississippi Valley State University. Jones, who was drafted in the 14th round of the 1961 NFL Draft by the Los Angeles Rams, would go on to become a standout defensive end accumulating 173½ sacks over his career, earning unanimous All-NFL honors for 6 consecutive years from 1965 through 1970 and 8 Pro Bowl selections. Jones also holds the distinctions of being an inaugural Black College Football Hall of Fame inductee (2010) and a member of the Pro Football Hall of Fame.

Winners

References

College football national player awards
Awards established in 2016